and Xianyou Pumped Storage Power Station is a pumped-storage hydroelectric power station located  west of Putian in Xianyou County of Fujian Province, China. Construction on the project began in May 2009 and the first generator was commissioned in April 2013, the last in December 2013. The power station operates by shifting water between an upper and lower reservoir to generate electricity. The lower reservoir was formed with the creation of the Xianyou Lower Dam on the Xikou River, a tributary of the Mulan River. The Xianyou Upper Reservoir is located in a valley above the east side of the lower reservoir on the Dajixi River, another tributary of the Mulan. During periods of low energy demand, such as at night, water is pumped from Xianyou Lower Reservoir up to the upper reservoir. When energy demand is high, the water is released back down to the lower reservoir but the pump turbines that pumped the water up now reverse mode and serve as generators to produce electricity. The process is repeated as necessary and the plant serves as a peaking power plant.

See also

List of pumped-storage power stations

References

Dams in China
Concrete-face rock-fill dams
Pumped-storage hydroelectric power stations in China
Dams completed in 2013
Energy infrastructure completed in 2013
2013 establishments in China
Hydroelectric power stations in Fujian
Underground power stations